Matthew Albence is a former American law enforcement officer and government official. He served as acting director of U.S. Immigration and Customs Enforcement from July 5, 2019 to August 25, 2020 and between April 13 and May 27, 2019.

Education
Albence received a B.S. in Justice and a M.S. in Administration of Justice. He is a member of the Senior Executive Service.

Career
Albence served as ICE's Deputy Director, selected for this position in August 2018 to lead immigration enforcement efforts. Prior to this assignment, Albence served as the agency's Executive Associate Director (EAD) for Enforcement and Removal Operations, leading ERO to identify, arrest, and remove people who enter the United States without official documentation or otherwise do not comply with immigration laws. He was appointed EAD in February 2017. In this role, Albence led an organization of more than 7,600 employees assigned to 24 ERO field offices and 22 overseas locations.

Albence played an active role in the Trump administration family separation policy, working to keep separated parents and children apart, in some cases coming up with novel ideas to block reunification, even after the parent had passed through the justice system. 

On July 31, 2020, Albence announced he would resign as ICE's director at the end of August.

References

Living people
Place of birth missing (living people)
American University alumni
Southern Illinois University alumni
Trump administration personnel
United States Border Patrol agents
U.S. Immigration and Customs Enforcement officials
Year of birth missing (living people)